Christian Patermann (born 1942 in Gliwice, Upper Silesia) is a lawyer and is considered  one of the pioneers of bioeconomics, agriculture, and foodstuffs in the European Union in Brussels.

Life and work 
Patermann finished his schooling in Braunschweig in West Germany in 1962. After studying private law  at the universities of Freiburg in Breisgau, Lausanne, Geneva, Munich and Bonn he passed his law examinations, and in 1969 he obtained a doctorate at the University of Bonn with a thesis entitled "The Development of the Principle of Free Consideration of Evidence in Ordinary Civil Proceedings in the Legislative Procedure and Case Law".

After passing his state examinations he worked from 1971 to 1996 for the Federal Ministry of Science, where he was engaged in the areas of space travel, ecology and global change. From 1998 to 1993 he was also press officer and leader of the managerial team of Federal Research Minister Heinz Riesenhuber.

From 1996 until his retirement in 2007 Patermann served in the Research Directorate of the European Union, responsible for Ecology and sustainability and as Programme Director for Biotechnology, Agriculture and Food shaped, in particular, the agricultural research framework of the EU.

Post-retrement
Since his retirement Patermann has been an advisor to numerous public and private enterprises and in 2009 was a founding member of the first German Bioökonomierats (Bio-economics Advisory Committee).
In 2011 he was recognised for his service to agricultural research with the award of an Honorary Doctorate in Agricultural Science by the Agricultural Faculty of Bonn University. Christian Patermann was appointed a member of the Accademia dei Georgofili in 2012. In 2018 he was appointed Fellow of the International Society of Horticultural Societies in Leuven (Louvain), the largest international Assembly in Horticulture worldwide.

External links 
 Dr. Christian Patermann on the Ibbnetzwerk 
 Christian Patermann im Chemiecluster Bayern
 International Bioeconomy Conference Halle opened by Christian Patermann
 Christian Patermann on youtube concerning Bioeconomy
 Christian Patermann Award 2022

References 

1942 births
Living people
20th-century German lawyers
University of Bonn alumni
German officials of the European Union
People from Gliwice
German agronomists